The following table indicates the party of elected officials in the U.S. state of New Jersey:
Governor
Lieutenant Governor

The table also indicates the historical party composition in the:
State Senate
State General Assembly
State delegation to the U.S. Senate
State delegation to the U.S. House of Representatives

For years in which a presidential election was held, the table indicates which party's nominees received the state's electoral votes.

1776–2009

2010–present

See also
Politics in New Jersey
Politics of New Jersey
Elections in New Jersey
Law of New Jersey

References

External links
State of New Jersey Department of State, Division of Elections
Year-by-Year Election Results

Politics of New Jersey
Government of New Jersey
New Jersey